Eulepidotis osseata is a moth of the family Erebidae first described by Constant Bar in 1875. It is found in the Neotropics, including Peru, French Guiana and Guyana.

References

Moths described in 1875
osseata
Moths of South America